The discography of Japanese pop singer Koda Kumi includes 17 studio albums, 2 cover albums, 10 compilation albums, 10 remix albums, 9 live albums and 57 singles. All of her Japanese musical releases have been with Rhythm Zone, a sub-label of Avex Group.

Koda originally debuted in the United States on Orpheus Records under the name Koda, with the singles "Take Back" (2000) and later "Trust Your Love" (2001), sung in English. The Japanese versions of these songs were used for her debut in Japan, and were released in December 2000 and May 2001. Her first album, Affection, was released in March 2002.

In the 12 weeks between December 2005 and February 2006, Koda released a single consecutively every week, which resulted in her first number one singles in Japan, "You" and "Feel". Her 2005 and 2006 compilation albums Best: First Things and Best: Second Session were both certified for two million copies shipped by the Recording Industry Association of Japan.

Starting in 2006 with 4 Hot Wave, Koda started to release annual summer singles featuring multiple promoted A-sides. This continued with "Freaky" (2007), Moon (2008), 3 Splash (2009), Gossip Candy (2010), 4 Times (2011), Summer Trip (2013), and "Hotel" (2014). Songs from these releases were compiled onto the album Summer of Love in 2015. 

From 2009, Koda began releasing a series of non-stop dance remix albums called Driving Hit's, featuring songs from her career mixed together into a 70-minute medley remix. In October 2010, Koda released her first album of covers, entitled Eternity: Love & Songs, featuring recordings of songs by Japanese musicians. Her second, Color the Cover, was released in February 2013.

Albums

Studio albums

Tribute and cover albums

Compilation albums

Remix albums

Live albums

Extended plays

Singles

As a lead artist

2000s

2010s

2020s

As a collaborating artist

Promotional singles

Other charted songs

Other appearances

See also
Koda Kumi videography

Notes

References 

Discography
Discographies of Japanese artists
Pop music discographies
Rhythm and blues discographies